Abrau sprat, Clupeonella abrau, is a species of freshwater fish in the family Clupeidae.  It is found landlocked in Russia in a single locality, Lake Abrau, located at 70 m above sea level near the Black Sea coast close to Novorossiysk. The lake is small and has been stocked by several alien species, whence the Abrau sprat is considered critically endangered.

A sprat of the Lake Apolyont in Turkey, linked to the Sea of Marmara, was earlier treated as a subspecies of the Abrau sprat, Clupeonella abrau muhilisi, but has more recently been considered an independent species Clupeonella muhlisi.

Sources

Clupeonella
Fish of Western Asia
Fish of Russia
Taxonomy articles created by Polbot
Fish described in 1930